Yuri Gonçalves de Souza (born 31 October 1997), commonly known as Yuri, is a Brazilian professional footballer who plays for French Championnat National 2 side AS Saint-Priest.

Career statistics

Club

Notes

References

1997 births
Living people
Brazilian footballers
Association football midfielders
Macaé Esporte Futebol Clube players
Grêmio Foot-Ball Porto Alegrense players
AS Saint-Priest players